The Walthamstow Pumphouse Museum is a museum based in Walthamstow, north-east London, it is contained in and around Low Hall Pumping Station, a Grade II listed building, originally built as a sewage pumping station in 1885.

The museum focuses on the pioneering achievements in road, rail, air and sea transport in Waltham Forest and the surrounding area from the early 19th century. The museum displays various artifacts, including AEC Routemaster buses, a pair of Marshall C class steam engines, and various fire fighting vehicles.

Also included in the museum's collection is a decommissioned London Underground 1967 Stock Victoria line carriage that is frequently used as a film set, concert venue for Underground Lunchtime Recitals and as a supper club three nights per week.

References

Infrastructure completed in 1885
Sewage pumping stations
Railway museums in England
History of the London Borough of Waltham Forest
Museums in the London Borough of Waltham Forest
Transport museums in London
Steam museums in England
Walthamstow
Former pumping stations
Grade II listed buildings in the London Borough of Waltham Forest